Mary Kelly-Lynch (Máire Uí Loinsigh) was the 20th president of the Camogie Association.

Playing career
She was introduced to camogie at secondary school in her native Carrickmacross and played for the county while still at school. She joined Celtic club after moving to Dublin, and won All Ireland medals partnering Kathleen Cody at midfield.

Administrator
After marrying Willie Lynch she returned to Carrickmacross, reorganising camogie in the county as county chair and trainer manager for Monaghan senior and junior teams. She continued to play and won a Monaghan Intermediate Championship medal with Carrickmacross in 1978. She served on the first primary schools committee, later chaired the fixtures committee and in 1985 was elected president of the association without opposition, having unsuccessfully contested the 1982 election. She inherited an association facing severe financial problems.

Other roles
She also served on Care of the Aged, Girl Guides, youth and recreational organisations, and social services.

References

Presidents of the Camogie Association
Gaelic games players from County Monaghan
Living people
Year of birth missing (living people)
Place of birth missing (living people)
Dublin camogie players